Tomasi Palu (born 23 September 1986) is a Tongan rugby union footballer. His usual position is Scrum-half. He was part of the Tongan squad at the 2011 Rugby World Cup where he played in two matches.

References

External links 

2011 Rugby World Cup Profile

1986 births
Living people
Rugby union players from Wellington City
New Zealand sportspeople of Tongan descent
Tongan rugby union players
Tonga international rugby union players
Wellington rugby union players
Doncaster R.F.C. players
Expatriate rugby union players in England
New Zealand expatriate sportspeople in England
Rugby union scrum-halves